Conrad "Conny" Schnitzler (17 March 1937 – 4 August 2011) was a prolific German experimental musician associated with West Germany's 1970s krautrock movement. A co-founder of West Berlin's Zodiak Free Arts Lab, he was an early member of Tangerine Dream (1969–1970) and a founder of the band Kluster. He left Kluster in 1971, first working with his group Eruption and then focusing on solo works. Schnitzler participated in several collaborations with other electronic musicians.

Biography
Schnitzler was born in Düsseldorf. His father was German, his mother was Italian. He had a wife and they had three children, one of whom is son Gregor Schnitzler, who was born in 1964 in Berlin and who is a film director. 

Schnitzler, Dieter Moebius, and Hans-Joachim Roedelius formed Kluster in 1969 after the three had met at the Zodiak Free Arts Lab. This trio released three albums: Klopfzeichen (1970), Zwei-Osterei (1971) and Eruption (1971). When Schnitzler left the group, Roedelius and Moebius became Cluster. Around this time, Schnitzler also joined Tangerine Dream for their debut album Electronic Meditation (1970).

Schnitzler provided the introductory music for Norwegian black metal band Mayhem's debut EP Deathcrush in 1987, following a meeting with teenage guitarist Euronymous in the mid-1980s. The instrumental track, entitled "Silvester Anfang", was randomly selected from Schnitzler's archive of works in progress. The piece is still played at most of the band's live shows. 
For many years Schnitzler appeared in the comics of Matt Howarth (particularly Savage Henry) as a member of the band The Bulldaggers. His 2006 work Moon Mummy is a collaboration with Matt Howarth based on an included PDF comic.

Schnitzler died from stomach cancer on 4 August 2011 in Berlin.

Discography

1970
 Electronic Meditation (with Tangerine Dream)
 Klopfzeichen (with Kluster)

1971
 Zwei-Osterei (with Kluster)
 Schwarz (a.k.a. Eruption)

1973
 Rot
 Slowmotion

1974
 Blau
 Work in Progress
 The Red Cassette
 The Black Cassette

1978
 Con

1980
 Auf Dem Schwarzen Kanal (EP)
 Consequenz (with )
 Die wandelnde Klangwolke aus Berlin

1981
 Contempora
 Con 3
 Conrad & Sohn (with Gregor Schnitzler)
 Conal
 Control
 Gelb (reissue of The Black Cassette as an LP)
 Grün
 Context

1982
 Convex
 The Russians Are Coming (EP, with Peter Baumann)
 Container

1983
 Con 3.3.83

1984
 Con '84

1985
 Con '85

1986
 Concert
 Consequenz II (with Wolfgang Seidel)
 Micon in Italia (with Michael Otto)
 Face on Radio (with Wolfgang Hertz)
 Con '86
 GenCon Productions (with Gen Ken Montgomery)
 Conversion Day

1987
 Congratulacion
 Contrasts (with Wolfgang Hertz)
 Black Box 1987
 Contra-Terrene
 Conditions of the Gas Giant
 Deathcrush (Silvester Anfang intro) (with Mayhem)

1988
 ConGen: New Dramatic Electronic Music (with Gen Ken Montgomery)
 CS 1 – CS 13: January 1988 – December 1988
 Concho (with Michael Chocholak)
 GenCon Dramatic (GenCon Live) (with Gen Ken Montgomery)

1989
 Constellations
 CS 89/1 – CS 89/12: January 1989 – December 1989
 The Cassette Concert (with Gen Ken Montgomery)

1990
 Kynak (Camma) (with Giancarlo Toniutti)
 CS 90/1 – CS 90/12: January 1990 – December 1990
 Confidential Tapes
 00/001 – 00/004: Confidential Tapes

1991
 Contempora 00/014 – 00/031

1992
 Tolling Toggle (with Jorg Thomasius)
 Tonart Eins (with Tonart)
 Ballet Statique (reissue of Con)
 Contempora 00/032 – 00/039

1993
 Clock Face (with Jorg Thomasius)
 Tonart Zwei (with Tonart)
 Con Brio
 Contempora 00/040 – 00/044

1994
 Blue Glow
 Con Repetizione
 Contempora 00/045 – 00/053

1995
 Charred Machinery
 Electronegativity

1997
 00/106
 The Piano Works 1
 00/44

1999
 Construction
 00/071: Piano
 00/063: Piano
 Con/Solo/1
 00/121: Piano
 00/139: Concert
 Con/Solo/2
 Computer Jazz

2000
 The 88 Game
 5.5.85 (Concert)

2001
 Conal2001
 Acon (with Hans-Joachim Roedelius)
 00/142-8 – MHz Records. Germany

2002
 Con '72

2003
 Live Action 1997
 Gold
 Contakt

2004
 Con '72 Part II

2005
 Mi.T.-Con 04 (with Michael Thomas Roe)

2006
 Moon Mummy
 Zug
 Aquatic Vine Music (with Michael Thomas Roe)
 Conviction
 Con 2+
 ElectroCon
 Klavierhelm
 Trigger Trilogy

2007
 Mic + Con 07 (with Michael Thomas Roe)

2008
 Kluster 2007 (with Michael Thomas Roe and Masato Ooyama)
 rare tracks 1979–1982 (with Remixes by Dompteur Mooner) Erkrankung durch Musique Records
 20070709 (with Bernhard Woestheinrich)

2009
 Aquafit (with Big Robot) – Karisma. Norway
 Kluster 2008: Three Olympic Cities Mix (with Michael Thomas Roe and Masato Ooyama)
 Horror Odyssee (with Big Robot) – TIBProd. Italy

2010
Kluster 2009: Three Voices (with Michael Thomas Roe and Masato Ooyama)

2011
 Consequenz 010B (with Wolfgang Seidel) – Mirror Tapes
 Kluster CMO 2010 (with Michael Thomas Roe and Masato Ooyama)
 Against The Grain (with Håvard Tveito, Ole Christensen, Kjetil Manheim, Johannes Stockhausen Hektoen, Fredrik Owesen, Tord Litleskare, Nils Martin Haugfoss, Marius Håndlykken, Shawn Ytterland and Vigleik Skogerbø)

2012
 Endtime

2015
 GEN CON Barbarella (with Gen Ken Montgomery, Arvo Zylo, Mama Baer, Kommissar Hjuler) – Psych.KG
 GEN CON FLUX (with Gen Ken Montgomery & Mama Baer, Kommissar Hjuler) – Psych.KG
 genconhjulachinsky (with Gen Ken Montgomery, Steve Dalachinsky & Kommissar Hjuler) – Psych.KG

References

External links
 Conrad Schnitzler Official
 Conrad Schnitzler Official (CON-tribute)
 
 
 Reviews of Schnitzler's work
 Schnitzler's entry in The Cassette Mythos
http://www.myspace.com/mitconmusic Mi.T.-CON
https://web.archive.org/web/20070711111624/http://www.mit-conmusic.com/ Mi.T.-CON
 2008 article/interview with Conrad Schnitzler at Perfect Sound Forever

1937 births
2011 deaths
German experimental musicians
Tangerine Dream members
German people of Italian descent
20th-century German musicians
Deaths from stomach cancer
Deaths from cancer in Germany